Phostria metalobalis is a moth in the family Crambidae. It was described by George Hampson in 1912. It is found in Guyana and Costa Rica.

References

Phostria
Moths described in 1912
Moths of Central America
Moths of South America